Major General Sir Leslie Gordon Phillips KBE CB MC (11 February 1892 – 19 March 1966) was a senior British Army officer during the Second World War.

Military career
Born on 11 February 1892, Leslie Gordon Phillips was educated at Bedford School and at Royal Military College, Sandhurst. He received his first commission in the Worcestershire Regiment as a second lieutenant in 1911 and served in France and Belgium during the First World War. He joined the Royal Corps of Signals in 1920 and served in Waziristan between 1936 and 1937. Promoted to the rank of major general in 1940, he served during the Second World War and was Signal Officer in Chief, Home Forces, between 1941 and 1943. He was Director of Signals at the War Office between 1943 and 1946.

Major General Sir Leslie Gordon Phillips was invested as a Companion of the Order of the Bath in 1943, and as a Knight Commander of the Order of the British Empire in 1946. He retired from the British Army in 1946 and died on 19 March 1966.

References

Bibliography

External links
Generals of World War II

1892 births
1966 deaths
British Army generals
People educated at Bedford School
Graduates of the Royal Military College, Sandhurst
British Army personnel of World War I
British Army personnel of World War II
Recipients of the Military Cross
Companions of the Order of the Bath
War Office personnel in World War II
Knights Commander of the Order of the British Empire
Worcestershire Regiment officers
Royal Corps of Signals officers